The 2013–14 Winthrop Eagles women's basketball team represents Winthrop University during the 2013–14 NCAA Division I women's basketball season. The Eagles, led by second year head coach Kevin Cook, play their home games at the Winthrop Coliseum and are members of the South Division of the Big South Conference.

Roster

Schedule

|-
!colspan=9 style="background:#8C2633; color:#FFD700;"| Regular season

|-
!colspan=9 style="background:#8C2633; color:#FFD700;"| 2014 Big South tournament

|-
!colspan=9 style="background:#8C2633; color:#FFD700;"| 2014 NCAA Tournament

References

Winthrop
Winthrop Eagles women's basketball seasons
Winthrop